The 1934–35 Campeonato da Liga season was the first season of top-tier football in Portugal. Although that, the most important national competition (in a knock-out cup format) was still called Portuguese Championship, until 1938, the competition was considered not very competitive with a reduced number of matches played by each team. So a new competition, in round-robin format was created ind 1934, with 8 clubs. Although at time the winner of the Portuguese Championship was considered the National Champion, later, the winner of Campeonato da Liga 1934–35 would be considered the first National Champion.

Overview

For the tournament, there were invited 8 clubs from the 4 major Portuguese District Football Associations: 4 teams from Lisbon FA, 2 from Porto FA, 1 from Setúbal FA and 1 from Coimbra FA. F.C. Porto won the championship. There were no relegations or promotions, since qualification was based on the results of the Regional Championships.

League standings

Results

References

Primeira Liga seasons
1934–35 in Portuguese football
Portugal